Rafael Baronesi (born Rio de Janeiro, February 19, 1981) is an actor, singer and television presenter from Brazil. He had the Zapping Zone, a program of the channel Disney Channel, but left the program on September 25, 2009.

Biography
Rafael began studying theater when he was 14. He performed as an amateur from the age of 4 years and at 17 years had his professional debut. 

He became famous when he entered the program Zapping Zone with Fabiola Ribeiro in 2004. In the program, besides being himself, "Rafa", as he is known, interpreted the critical character of the game of ZZ. He presented the program with Thays Gorga, Daniel Bianchin and Yasmim Manaia. In 2011 he was hired by Shoptime. In 2018, he was hired by Rede Bandeirantes.

Works
 Programs and soap operas
 Disney Channel Games, Team Red – Disney (2008)

 Soap
 Family Ties – Figurante Globo (2001)
 Kubanacan – Globo (2003)
 Malhação – Globo
 Cama de Gato – Host of a TalkShow – Globo
 Miniseries
 Only One Heart – Globo (2004)

 Theater
 Marriage Party
 The Athenaeum
 Youth Conturbada
 Nerium Park 

 Television Show
 Zapping Zone – Disney Channel (2004–2009)

 Special on Disney Channel
 The Chronicles of Narnia
 Ratatouille
 Cars
 Pirates of the Caribbean
 The Witch Mountain

 Clip
 Flirting with me (Raddi Paparazzi – Rafael Baroneso)

 Music
 Let's go! (Disney Channel Games)

References

Brazilian television personalities
Living people
1981 births